King Maker III is a 2020 Hong Kong survival reality show on ViuTV as third season of , accepting both male and female debuted artists or appearing in TV show before as contestants. The contestants include former girl group As One member  (Wai Suen), boy group  member Alan Lam, actor , singers  and Karen Kong. It aired from 2 November to 26 December 2020, with  being the champion, Kira Chan being the first runner-up, Ansonbean being the second runner-up, and Cloud Wan receiving the most votes by audiences in final.

Aftermath
Eight contestants from the competition, including Chiu, Kira Chan, Ansonbean, Wan,  (CY), Koo and Terence Ng, debuted as soloists after the competition. Ip, who debuted in 2013, gained popularity after the show and saved her music career.

References

External links

2020s Hong Kong television series
Cantonese-language television shows
Reality music competition television series
2020 in Hong Kong television